Alexandre Ippolito (born 5 January 1999) is a Belgian professional footballer who plays as a forward for Luxembourger club Wiltz 71.

Professional career
Ippolito debut for Mouscron in a 3-2 Belgian First Division A loss to Cercle Brugge K.S.V. on 6 April 2019. On 4 November 2019, Ippolito signed his first professional contract with Mouscron.

References

External links

1999 births
Belgian people of Italian descent
Living people
Belgian footballers
Association football forwards
Royal Excel Mouscron players
FC Wiltz 71 players
Belgian Pro League players
Luxembourg National Division players
Belgian expatriate footballers
Expatriate footballers in Luxembourg
Belgian expatriate sportspeople in Luxembourg